The 1940–41 Latvian Higher League season was a season of the Latvian Higher League. It was interrupted by the Soviet Union invasion.

Participants
Rīgas FK
Rigas Vilki
FK ASK
VEF
Hakoah
US
RKSB
RAFS
Lokomotive
Olimpija

References
RSSSF

Latvian Higher League seasons
1941 in Latvian football
1940 in Latvian football
Latvia